John Paul II Minor Seminary (abbreviated "JPIIMS") is the high school seminary of the Diocese of Antipolo located along Maguey Road, Barangay San Luis, Antipolo, Rizal, Philippines. The seminary was established in 2007, with a pioneer of forty-eight (48) first year seminarians in June 2007, coming from the Province of RIzal and from some parts of Metro Manila. The seminary produced its first batch of graduates at the end of the academic year 2010–2011. At present, the school follows the K-12 basic education system, which is the curriculum implemented by the Department of Education, with lay teachers coming from Our Lady of Peace School beside Antipolo Cathedral. Current Principal is Sr. Nelia Montuya

Rectors

Rev. Fr. Mabini O. Cabildo 
(2007-2010) 
Rev. Fr. Joselito A. Santos 
(2010-2011) 
Rev. Fr. Jose C. Bautista 
(2011-2016) 
Rev. Fr. Neil Vincent M. Tacbas, Ed.D 
(2016–2021)
Rev. Msgr. Pedro C. Cañonero, Ph.D (2021-present)

References

 Diocese of Antipolo Web
Religious of the Virgin Mary
Diocese of Antipolo

Educational institutions established in 2007
Seminaries and theological colleges in the Philippines
Catholic minor seminaries
Schools in Antipolo
2007 establishments in the Philippines